Quickplay is a Canada-based software and platform provider for the distribution of premium video to IP-connected devices. The company's cloud-native platform powers video services for Tier 1 streaming providers, among them aha (streaming service), Rogers Sports & Media's Sportsnet Now, and PLDT's Smart Communications. Quickplay is owned by Firstlight Media Ltd.

Quickplay is headquartered in Toronto, Ontario; with a headend in San Diego California, and  offices in Los Angeles, California, and Chennai, India. Firstlight Media Ltd partnered with Highview Capital Partners to acquire Quickplay Media from AT&T in March, 2020.; the company was rebranded as Quickplay in 2022.

Quickplay had originally been founded in 2004 to power mobile video services for live TV, video on demand (VOD) and radio services for companies including AT&T Wireless, Bell Mobility, Verizon Wireless, Motorola Mobility, Rogers Wireless, Research In Motion, Sirius XM, and U.S. Cellular. Madison Dearborn Partners became a majority owner in 2012. AT&T announced on May 16, 2016, that it would acquire Quickplay from Madison Dearborn Partners. It remained a subsidiary of AT&T until 2020.

References

External links

Mediacaster Magazine Quickplay Meets Growing Demand for HD Multiscreen Video Services
Techcrunch PE Firm Madison Dearborn Pays $100M For A Majority Stake In Cloud Video Company Quickplay Media
The Wall Street Journal Madison Dearborn Invests $100M in Cloud Provider Quickplay

Companies based in Toronto
Streaming television
Mobile television
Video on demand services
Former AT&T subsidiaries